Pootatuck State Forest is a Connecticut state forest located mainly in the town of New Fairfield with a small fraction in Sherman. Recreational activities include hiking, mountain biking, letterboxing, hunting, birdwatching, snowmobiling, and cross-country skiing. The main forest property borders on and can be accessed via trails from the adjacent Squantz Pond State Park.

There are two smaller Pootatuck State Forest property parcels in New Fairfield, Connecticut near to but disconnected from the main property and  Squantz Pond State Park.

The Western Pootatuck State Forest parcel is located north of Beaver Bog Road just west of the intersection of Beaver Bog Road and Short Woods Road. (GPS: 41.493866, -73.490825)
The Southern Pootatuck State Forest parcel is located between Short Woods Road and CT Route 39 slightly south of the intersection of Beaver Bog Road and Short Woods Road. (GPS: 41.494402, -73.484836)

References

External links
Pootatuck State Forest Connecticut Department of Energy and Environmental Protection
Pootatuck State Forest Map Connecticut Department of Energy and Environmental Protection

Connecticut state forests
Parks in Fairfield County, Connecticut
New Fairfield, Connecticut
Sherman, Connecticut
Protected areas established in the 1920s
1920s establishments in Connecticut